Eric Da Re (born March 3, 1965) is an American actor who played the notorious criminal Leo Johnson on the TV show Twin Peaks and its prequel film, Twin Peaks: Fire Walk with Me. He has worked behind the scenes in several other films by Twin Peaks creator David Lynch. He is the son of the actor Aldo Da Re (stage name Aldo Ray) and the casting director Johanna Ray, a frequent Lynch collaborator.

Biography
Da Re was born in Los Angeles, California, United States.  He is the son of the actor Aldo Ray (born Aldo Da Re), and is of Italian descent on his father's side. His mother is Johanna Ray, an award-winning casting director (Blue Velvet, Mulholland Drive, Showgirls), who did casting for Twin Peaks.

Da Re's first role was in the TV movie Into the Homeland in 1987, which was directed by Lesli Linka Glatter, who would direct Da Re on Twin Peaks. After a few more roles in TV movies he landed the role of Leo Johnson in the 1990 cult classic Twin Peaks, created by David Lynch. Da Re went on to work with Lynch again as a casting assistant for Wild at Heart (1990), as Leo Johnson in the Twin Peaks prequel, Twin Peaks: Fire Walk with Me (1992) and as a property buyer for Lost Highway (1997).

In 1992 he was Bernie in Critters 4.
He also had roles in the Paul Verhoeven film Starship Troopers (1997) and in Ted Bundy (2002).

He is sometimes credited as Eric Da Re, Eric DaRae or Eric Dare.

Eric attended Horace Mann elementary and Beverly Hills High School with fellow actor Nicolas Cage.

Filmography

Film

Television

References

External links

1965 births
American male television actors
American male film actors
American people of Italian descent
Living people
Male actors from Los Angeles